This is about the American naval officer. For others, see Donald Duncan (disambiguation).

Donald Bradley Duncan (1896–1975) was an admiral in the United States Navy, who played an important role in aircraft-carrier operations during World War II.

Duncan graduated from the United States Naval Academy in 1917, and was assigned to the USS Oklahoma (BB-37). He received a master's degree in radio engineering from Harvard University in 1925.

In 1941, he was the first commander of the USS Long Island, the Navy's first escort aircraft carrier.

As the air operations officer to Admiral Ernest J. King, Duncan assisted with the planning for the Doolittle Raid, and was the one who proposed the use of both the B-25 Mitchell bombers and the Hornet (CV-8) for the raid.  He was then appointed to be the first commanding officer of the carrier Essex (CV-9).

Duncan held several important staff and operational positions following the war.  He served as Deputy Chief of Naval Operations (Air) from March 6, 1947 to January 20, 1948.  He commanded the 2nd Task Fleet after 1948, and was the Vice Chief of Naval Operations from 1951 to 1956.

Following his retirement from the navy on March 1, 1957, he served as Governor of the Naval Home until May 1962. He died on September 8, 1975.

Awards
 Naval Aviator insignia
 Legion of Merit
 Navy Presidential Unit Citation with one bronze service star
 National Defense Service Medal

 Order of the British Empire, Military Division

See also

References
An oral history recorded in 1964 is in the Butler Library at Columbia University.

1896 births
1975 deaths
United States Navy admirals
Vice Chiefs of Naval Operations
United States Navy World War II admirals
United States Naval Academy alumni
Harvard School of Engineering and Applied Sciences alumni
Recipients of the Legion of Merit